"I Luv U Baby" is the debut single of dance music group the Original, released in late 1994. It was written and produced by Walter Taieb and Giuseppe Nuzzo, with vocals performed by Broadway singer Everett Bradley. Upon its first release in the United Kingdom, the song peaked at number 31 in January 1995, but a re-release later that year proved much more successful, reaching the number-two spot. The song also reached number 12 in Ireland and the top 40 in Iceland and the Netherlands. In 1996, "I Luv U Baby" charted in the United States, making it to number 66 on the Billboard Hot 100.

Critical reception
Brad Beatnik from Music Week'''s RM'' Dance Update gave the song five out of five, calling it a "thumping piano house tune" that was "apparently rather large in Ibiza this summer". Another editor, James Hamilton described it as "title line moaned and keyboards tinkled cantering".

Charts

Weekly charts

Year-end charts

Certifications

References

1994 debut singles
1994 songs
1995 singles
House music songs